Mario Mauricio Alborta Velasco (19 September 1910 – 1 January 1976, in Bolivia)  was a Bolivian football forward.

Career 
During his career he participated in the 1926 and 1927 South American Championship, and made two appearances for the Bolivia national team at the 1930 FIFA World Cup. His career in club football was spent in Club Bolivar between 1925 and 1939

Achievements 
Liga de Fútbol Amateur Boliviano: 3

1932, 1937, 1939

References

External links
 
 

1910 births
1976 deaths
Association football forwards
Bolivian footballers
Bolivia international footballers
1930 FIFA World Cup players
Club Bolívar players